Freddie Clarke (born 10 October 1992) is an English rugby union player who plays at flanker for Gloucester Rugby.

During his early career, Clarke turned out for the University of Bath during which time they won the British Universities and Colleges Sport (BUCS) Rugby Sevens Championship for the first time. Clarke also played for Bath, helping their A-League side, Bath United, win the A-League title during the 2013-14 season.

Clarke was selected for the Great Britain Students team which won the World University Rugby Sevens Championships in Brazil. The success in South America earned him a call-up to the England Sevens squad which competed in the 2014 Sevens Grand Prix Series. He capped at England Students level six times and has captained the side as well.

On 2 June 2015, Clarke signed a one-year professional deal to join London Scottish in the RFU Championship during the 2015-16 season. In 2016, he left the Athletic Ground, Richmond to join Aviva Premiership side Gloucester Rugby as part of the academy squad during the 2016-17 season.

On 17 May 2017, Clarke signed a new one-year senior contract with Gloucester from the 2017-18 season.

in 2017-18, Clarke made 27 first team appearances. Improving from 9 games the previous season and becoming a first team regular. Again signing a new contract at the close of the season.

In June 2022 he was called up by Eddie Jones to join a training camp with the senior England squad.

References

External links
Gloucester Rugby Profile

1992 births
Living people
English rugby union players
Gloucester Rugby players
London Scottish F.C. players
Rugby union players from Wandsworth
Team Bath rugby union players
Rugby union flankers